Kayla Noelle Sanchez (born 7 April 2001) is a Filipina-Canadian swimmer. A member of the Canadian national team until 2022, she has represented Canada at the Olympic and World championship level, and is a two-time Olympic medalist. She is one of Canada's most prominent Filipina Canadian athletes.

Early life
Kayla Sanchez was born on 7 April 2001 in Singapore. She was born to Filipino parents who were Overseas Filipino Workers; her father is a native of Mabalacat, Pampanga while her mother traces her roots to Baguio. Her family eventually emigrated to Canada.

Career

2017 season 
Sanchez made her debut in major international competition in 2017, as part of the Canadian team for the 2017 World Junior Swimming Championships team in Indianapolis. She won two individual medals, a silver in the 200 m individual medley and bronze in the 100 m freestyle, and was part of a Canadian sweep of the gold medals in the women's relay events, taking gold in the 4x100 m and 4x200 freestyle as well as in the 4x100 medley. In the process the team broke the junior world record and championship record.

Later that year she also competed at her senior championships, the 2017 World Aquatics Championships in Budapest. Sanchez was part of the Canadian team in the women's 4×100 m freestyle relay event, finishing fourth overall.

2018 season 
In September 2017, Sanchez was named to Canada's 2018 Commonwealth Games team. Individually, she finished sixth in the 50 m freestyle, seventh in the 100 m freestyle, and ninth in the heats of the 200 m medley. She won two silver medals as part of the Canadian relay teams in the 4x100 m and 4x200 m.

2019 season 
In the Autumn of 2019, Sanchez was member of the inaugural International Swimming League swimming for the Energy Standard International Swim Club, who won the team title in Las Vegas, Nevada, in December. At the London match in November she won the 200m Freestyle over teammate Femke Heemskerk in a time of 1:52.72.  Competing as part of the Canadian team for the 2019 World Aquatics Championships in Gwangju, she won bronze medals in the 4x100 m and 4x200 m freestyle relays.

2020 Summer Olympics 
In 2021, Sanchez was part of the Canadian team for the 2020 Summer Olympics in Tokyo. She won a silver medal as part of the Canadian team in the 4x100 m freestyle relay, alongside Maggie Mac Neil, Rebecca Smith, and Penny Oleksiak. She also swam the freestyle leg in the heats of the 4x100 m medley relay, helping the Canadian team finish the heats in first place, and earned a bronze medal when the finals team finished third (having been replaced in the final by Oleksiak).

Sanchez competed individually in the heats of the 100 m freestyle, setting a new personal best and qualifying through to the semi-finals, but withdrew to conserve energy for the 4x200 m freestyle relay, where the Canadian team ultimately finished fourth.

2021 season
Sanchez announced plans to study political science at the University of British Columbia beginning in January 2022, following the completion of the ISL's third season. As part of her studies she would compete as part of UBC's Thunderbirds swimming team.

The season concluded at the 2021 World Swimming Championships, where Sanchez won four medals (three gold and one silver) as part of Canadian relay teams.

2022 season
At the Canadian swimming trials for upcoming championship events, Sanchez was fourth in the 200 m freestyle, before unexpectedly winning the 100 m event, finishing 0.02 ahead of Penny Oleksiak. She concluded the event with a decisive win in the 50 m freestyle.

Beginning the 2022 World Aquatics Championships in the 4x100 m freestyle relay, Sanchez was part of Canada's silver medal-winning team, a first for Canadian women at the World Championships. She won her second medal of the championships in the 4×200 m freestyle relay, where the Canadian team finished third. On the same day, Sanchez placed sixth in the semi-finals of the 100 m freestyle, qualifying to her first individual Worlds final. Sanchez qualified to the semi-finals of the 50 m freestyle, but scratched from the semi-finals in order to conserve energy for the 4×100 m mixed freestyle relay final in the same session. She recorded a personal best relay split time of 52.52 as part of the Canadian team's silver medal win. Sanchez then competed the freestyle leg for Team Canada in the heats of the 4×100 m medley relay, helping the team qualify to the final in fourth position. She was replaced in the final by Oleksiak, but shared in the team's bronze medal win. She, Oleksiak and Summer McIntosh jointly set a record at the championships for most medals by a Canadian swimmer at a single edition, with four each.

In July 2022, Philippine Swimming announced that Sanchez would start representing the Philippines

Personal bests

Long course (50 m pool)

References

External links
 
 

2001 births
Living people
Canadian female freestyle swimmers
Canadian female medley swimmers
Canadian sportspeople of Filipino descent
Sportspeople from Scarborough, Toronto
Swimmers from Toronto
Swimmers at the 2018 Commonwealth Games
Commonwealth Games medallists in swimming
Commonwealth Games silver medallists for Canada
World Aquatics Championships medalists in swimming
Olympic silver medalists for Canada
Olympic silver medalists in swimming
Medalists at the 2020 Summer Olympics
Swimmers at the 2020 Summer Olympics
Medalists at the FINA World Swimming Championships (25 m)
Canadian people of Filipino descent
Medallists at the 2018 Commonwealth Games